The 2003 SWAC men's basketball tournament was held March 11–15, 2003, at Bill Harris Arena in Birmingham, Alabama.  defeated , 77–68 in the championship game. The Tigers received the conference's automatic bid to the 2003 NCAA tournament as one of two No. 16 seeds in the South Region. In the play-in game, Alcorn State was beaten by UNC Asheville.

Bracket and results

References

2002–03 Southwestern Athletic Conference men's basketball season
SWAC men's basketball tournament